Salis-Seewis may refer to:

People
Johann von Salis-Seewis (1862–1940), Austro-Hungarian military officer.
Johann Gaudenz von Salis-Seewis (1762–1834), Swiss poet.

Other
Count de Salis-Seewis, a primogenitive title.

Surnames of Swiss origin